The Costa Rica women's national football team represents Costa Rica in women's international football. The national team is controlled by the governing body Costa Rican Football Federation. They are one of the top women's national football teams in the Central American region along with Guatemala and Panama.

Since 2010s, Costa Rica has emerged in women's football, and akin to their men's counterparts, its women's side is also visibly recognised as a stern and competitive opponent despite relative recent entrance to the big stage. In Costa Rica's first World Cup in 2015, despite being rated the weakest team in the group, Costa Rica shocked the tournament with two points by drawing against strong Spain and South Korea sides, and was only eliminated by a late goal from Brazil.

History
The Costa Rican team just started to play an international match in 1990, when Central America was on struggle about developing women's football. The success of men's team helped the FCF to believe on the women's team. Their first tournament, was the 1991 CONCACAF Women's Championship when Costa Rica finished third and was out from the group stage.

Despite this, Costa Rica started gaining success in the 1998 CONCACAF Women's Championship and 1999 Pan American Games when Costa Rica won bronze both. But later, Costa Rica did not gain much successful achievement, as the national team was still on struggle under the shadow of men's team.

At the 2014 CONCACAF Women's Championship, Costa Rica surprisingly won silver, after losing 0–6 to the USA in the final. Their second-place finish secured them a spot in the 2015 FIFA Women's World Cup. This marked the first time Costa Rica would play in a FIFA Women's World Cup.

Costa Rica was drawn into a group with Brazil, South Korea and Spain for the 2015 FIFA Women's World Cup. Costa Rica secured two shocking draws over Spain (1–1) and South Korea (2–2), but then lost 1–0 to Brazil and were eliminated in the group stage.

At the 2018 CONCACAF Women's Championship, Costa Rica was hoping to once again qualify for the FIFA Women's World Cup. They won their first group match 8–0 over Cuba. However they lost their second match 1–0 to Jamaica in which they controversially had a goal disallowed in the second half. Costa Rica would lose their final group match to Canada 3–1, elimating their chances of qualifying for the 2019 FIFA Women's World Cup.

Costa Rica has done much better in the 2022 CONCACAF W Championship, taking second place after wins over Panama and Trinidad and Tobago. Though unable to repeat the 2014 feat, only finished fourth in process, the win allowed Costa Rica to return to the Women's World Cup in 2023.

Team image

Nicknames
The Costa Rica women's national football team has been known or nicknamed as "" or "".

Home stadium
Costa Rica plays their home matches on the Estadio Nacional de Costa Rica.

Results and fixtures

The following is a list of match results in the last 12 months, as well as any future matches that have been scheduled.

Legend

2022

2023

Costa Rica Results and Fixtures – Soccerway.com
Costa Rica Results and Fixtures – FIFA.com

Coaching staff

Current coaching staff

Manager history

 Amelia Valverde (2015–)

Players

Up-to-date caps, goals, and statistics are not publicly available; therefore, caps and goals listed may be incorrect.

Current squad
The following 23 players were named to the squad for the 2022 CONCACAF W Championship.
Caps and goals are updated as of 23 February 2023 after the match against .

Recent call-ups
The following players have been called up to a Costa Rica squad in the past 12 months.

Notes:
: Preliminary roster

Previous squads

FIFA women's World Cup
2015 FIFA Women's World Cup squad

CONCACAF W Championship
2010 CONCACAF Women's World Cup Qualifying squad
2014 CONCACAF Women's Championship squad
2018 CONCACAF Women's Championship squad

Records

Players in bold are still active, at least at club level.

Most capped players

Top goalscorers

Competitive record

FIFA Women's World Cup

*Draws include knockout matches decided on penalty kicks.

Olympic Games

*Draws include knockout matches decided on penalty kicks.

CONCACAF Women's Championship

*Draws include knockout matches decided on penalty kicks.

Pan American Games

*Draws include knockout matches decided on penalty kicks.

Central American and Caribbean Games

*Draws include knockout matches decided on penalty kicks.

Central American Games

*Draws include knockout matches decided on penalty kicks.

FIFA World Ranking

Last update was on June 25, 2021
Source:

 Best Ranking   Worst Ranking   Best Mover   Worst Mover

See also

Sport in Costa Rica
Football in Costa Rica
Women's football in Costa Rica
Costa Rica women's national football team
Costa Rica women's national football team results
List of Costa Rica women's international footballers
Costa Rica women's national under-20 football team
Costa Rica women's national under-17 football team
Costa Rica men's national football team

References

External links
Official website 
Costa Rica profile at FIFA.com

 
Central American women's national association football teams